The Red Data Book of Ukraine, or literally the Red Book of Ukraine (Chervona knyha Ukrayiny), is an official national red list of the threatened animals, plants and fungi that are protected by the law in Ukraine. 

State administration, conservation regulation and control of species is provided by the state institutions such as the Cabinet of Ukraine, Ministry of Ecology (Ministry of Environmental Protection and Natural Resources), and other state institutions.

Scientific support for the Red Data Book is provided by the National Commission on the Red Data Book issues that prepares propositions about including and excluding species from the Red Data Book, provides control over materials preparation, determination of edition structure and coordination of related activities. The National Commission on the Red Data Book issues is formed by the National Academy of Sciences of Ukraine based on its Schmalhausen Institute of Zoology and Cholodny Institute of Botany that directly conduct registry of the red data.

The first edition of the Ukrainian Red Data Book was published in 1980, just couple of years after there was released the first edition of the Soviet Red Data Book. It was published by the National Academy of Sciences of Ukraine publishing house Naukova Dumka.

In 1994 and 1996 there was released the second edition of the Book by the Ukrainian Encyclopedia.

In 2009 the Third Edition of the Red Book of Ukraine was released by Global Consulting Ukraine.

As of 2019 the 1369 species are protected by the Red Book of Ukraine.

See also 
 Ukrainian Encyclopedia (publishing)
 Red Data List

References

External links 

Law of Ukraine #3055-III About the Red Data Book of Ukraine (Про Червону книгу України). Verkhovna Rada. 2002

Nature conservation in Ukraine
Biota of Ukraine
Ecology literature
IUCN Red List
Ukrainian books